Leontyevshchina is a rural locality (a village) in Yenangskoye Rural Settlement, Kichmengsko-Gorodetsky District, Vologda Oblast, Russia. The population was 31 as of 2002.

Geography 
Leontyevshchina is located 48 km east of Kichmengsky Gorodok (the district's administrative centre) by road. Rudnikovo is the nearest rural locality.

References 

Rural localities in Kichmengsko-Gorodetsky District